Antonio Joseph (August 25, 1846 – April 19, 1910) was a Delegate from the Territory of New Mexico.

Born in St. Louis, Missouri, Joseph attended Lux's Academy in Taos, Bishop Lamy's School in Santa Fe, New Mexico, Webster College in St. Louis County, Missouri, and Bryant and Stratton's Commercial College in St. Louis, Missouri.  He then engaged in mercantile pursuits.
He was county judge of Taos County, New Mexico from 1878 to 1880.  He then moved to Ojo Caliente, New Mexico, in 1880, and served as member of the Territorial house of representatives in 1882.

Joseph was elected as a Democrat to the Forty-ninth and to the four succeeding Congresses (March 4, 1885 – March 3, 1895).  He was an unsuccessful candidate for reelection in 1894 to the Fifty-fourth Congress.  He served in the Territorial senate 1896–1898, serving as president of that body in 1898.

He again engaged in the mercantile business and was an owner of hotels and owned extensive real estate holdings. He died in Ojo Caliente, New Mexico, April 19, 1910, and was interred in Fairview Cemetery, Santa Fe, New Mexico.

Sources

1846 births
1910 deaths
Bryant and Stratton College alumni
Members of the New Mexico Territorial Legislature
Delegates to the United States House of Representatives from New Mexico Territory
Neomexicanos
19th-century American politicians
New Mexico Democrats